Ronnie Clayton may refer to:
Ronnie Clayton (footballer, born 1934) (1934–2010), Blackburn Rovers and England footballer
Ronnie Clayton (footballer, born 1937), Brighton & Hove Albion footballer
Ronnie Clayton (boxer) (1923–1999), British boxer
Ronnie Clayton (Coronation Street), a character on Coronation Street